Enrico Guarna (born 11 August 1985) is an Italian professional footballer who plays as a goalkeeper for Italian club Ascoli.

Club career
On 6 July 2021, he returned to Ascoli on a two-year contract.

References

External links
 
 

1985 births
Living people
People from Catanzaro
Footballers from Calabria
Italian footballers
Association football goalkeepers
S.S. Virtus Lanciano 1924 players
A.C. Ancona players
Ascoli Calcio 1898 F.C. players
Spezia Calcio players
S.S.C. Bari players
Calcio Foggia 1920 players
A.C. Monza players
Reggina 1914 players
Serie B players
Serie C players
Serie D players
Sportspeople from the Province of Catanzaro